Cross My Heart is a 1937 British drama film directed by Bernard Mainwaring and starring Kathleen Gibson, Kenne Duncan and Tully Comber. It was made at Pinewood Studios as a quota quickie for release by Paramount Pictures.

Plot
A woman turns a boarding house into a nightclub, but faces problems when it is raided by the police.

Cast
 Kathleen Gibson as Sally Nichols 
 Kenne Duncan as Steve King 
 Tully Comber as Chesty Barlow 
 Aubrey Fitzgerald as The Major 
 Robert Field as Mabardi 
 Muriel Johnston as Miss Bly 
 Eric Hales as Mr. Bland 
 Sylvia Coleridge as Alice 
 Sam Blake as Snowball 
 Frank Tickle as Henry

References

Bibliography
 Chibnall, Steve. Quota Quickies: The British of the British 'B' Film. British Film Institute, 2007.
 Low, Rachael. Filmmaking in 1930s Britain. George Allen & Unwin, 1985.
 Wood, Linda. British Films, 1927-1939. British Film Institute, 1986.

External links

1937 films
1937 drama films
British drama films
1930s English-language films
Films directed by Bernard Mainwaring
Films shot at Pinewood Studios
Paramount Pictures films
Films produced by Anthony Havelock-Allan
British black-and-white films
British and Dominions Studios films
1930s British films